Francis Emanuel Shober (October 24, 1860 – October 7, 1919) was an American educator, newspaperman, and religious leader who served one term as a U.S. Representative from New York from 1903 to 1905. He was the son of Francis Edwin Shober.

Biography 
Born in Salisbury, North Carolina, Shober studied under private tutors.
He was graduated from St. Stephen's College, Annandale, New York, in 1880.
He engaged in ministerial and educational work in Dutchess County, New York.
Reporter on the News-Press of Poughkeepsie.
Pastor of St. John's Episcopal Church at Barrytown, New York from 1880 to 1891.

He was editor of the Rockaway Journal at Far Rockaway, New York.
He served as member of the editorial staff of the New York World.

Congress 
Shober was elected as a Democrat to the Fifty-eighth Congress (March 4, 1903 – March 3, 1905).
He was an unsuccessful candidate for renomination in 1904.
Deputy tax appraiser of the State of New York in 1907 and 1908.

Later career and death 
He resumed newspaper work.
He was editor of the New York American until his death in New York City October 7, 1919.
He was interred in Worcester Cemetery, Danbury, Connecticut.

Sources

External links

 

1860 births
1919 deaths
Democratic Party members of the United States House of Representatives from New York (state)
People from Salisbury, North Carolina
People from Barrytown, New York
19th-century American politicians